The  Nicaraguan Postal Service, is a postal service that is decentralized from the Nicaraguan government, but offers a public service to the people.

See also 
Universal Postal Union
Postal Union of the Americas, Spain and Portugal

Nicaragua
Postal system of Nicaragua
Philately of Nicaragua